Narasinha Dutt College is an undergraduate college in Howrah, West Bengal, India. Established in 1924, it claims to be the oldest college in Howrah district. It is affiliated with the University of Calcutta.

History
Narasinha Dutt College was established in July 1924 in the home of I. R. Belilious, at Howrah. It started with seven teachers and 124 students. The initiative in this regard was taken by Late Suranjan Dutta, the second son of Late Narasinha Dutta. The College started with Motilal Chatterjee as Principal and renowned scholar Jnanendranath Sen as Vice-Principal. Later on Prof. Sen became the Principal and remained in office for a long time to play the role of the architect of the college. Haripada Bharati also served as principal of the college.

With the passage of time, new building came to be erected, enrolment of students steadily picked up and fourteen honours courses were opened. The Morning Shift is exclusively for girls, the Evening Shift exclusively for boys and the Day Shift is Co-educational.

Departments

Science

Mathematics
Physics
Chemistry
Anthropology
Computer Science
Botany
Zoology
Economics

Arts and Commerce

Bengali
English
Sanskrit
Urdu
History
Political Science
Philosophy
Education
Commerce

Post Graduate Departments (Under C.U.)

English
Mathematics

Accreditation
Recently, Narasinha Dutt College has been re-accredited and awarded B++ grade by the National Assessment and Accreditation Council (NAAC). The college is also recognized by the University Grants Commission (UGC).

See also 
List of colleges affiliated to the University of Calcutta
Education in India
Education in West Bengal

References

External links
Narasinha Dutt College

Universities and colleges in Howrah district
University of Calcutta affiliates
Educational institutions established in 1924
1924 establishments in India